Tkaczewska Góra  (German Neu-Württemberg) is a village in the administrative district of Gmina Parzęczew, within Zgierz County, Łódź Voivodeship, in central Poland.

References

Villages in Zgierz County